The following is a list of United States Army Installations that have been closed down;

List

 Alaska
 Fort Davis, Alaska
 Alabama
 Fort McClellan
 Brookley Field
 Arizona
 Camp Bouse
 Arkansas
 Fort Logan H. Roots
 California
 Camp Anza
 Camp Callan
 Camp Kearny
 Camp Kohler
 Camp Lawrence J. Hearn
 Camp Lockett
 Fort Humboldt
 Fort MacArthur
 Fort Mason
 Camp McQuaide
 Camp Santa Anita
 Camp Seeley
 Camp Stoneman
 Camp Young
Castle Air Force Base
 Desert Training Center
 Fort Baker
 Fort Ord
 Fort Point
 Fort Tejon
 Fort Winfield Scott
 Fort Yuma
 Oakland Army Base
 Mare Island Naval Shipyard
 Mather Air Force Base
 McClellan Air Force Base
 Presidio of San Francisco
 Sacramento Army Depot
 San Carlos War Dog Training Center
 Colorado
 Fitzsimons Army Medical Center
 Camp Hale
 Fort Garland
 Camp George West Historic District COANG
 Rocky Mountain Arsenal
 District of Columbia – Washington, D.C.
 Camp Leach
 Walter Reed Army Medical Center
 Florida
 Camp Gordon Johnston
 Camp Murphy
 Daytona Beach WAC Training Center
 Georgia
 Camp Connolly
 Camp Toccoa
 Camp Wheeler
 Fort Gillem
 Fort McPherson
 Fort Oglethorpe
 Idaho
 Idaho Launch Complex
 Illinois
 Camp Lincoln
 Camp Ellis
 Camp Grant
 Eighth Regiment Armory (Chicago)
 Fort Sheridan
 George Field
 Green River Ordinance Plant
 Joliet Army Ammunition Plant
 Savanna Army Depot
 Indiana
 Fort Benjamin Harrison
 Newport Chemical Depot
 Kansas
 Camp Phillips
 Louisiana
 Camp Claiborne
 Camp Livingston
 Camp Pontchartrain
 Maryland
 Edgewood Chemical Activity (aka: Edgewood Arsenal)
 Fort Ritchie
 Catoctin Training Center
 Fort Holabird
 Fort Howard (Maryland)
 Fort Washington
 Logan Field (Airport) (USAAF and POW Camp)
 Massachusetts
 Camp Candoit
 Camp Havedoneit
 Camp Myles Standish
 Camp Washburn
 Camp Wellfleet
 Michigan
 Fort Brady
 Chrysler Tank School
 Minnesota
 Camp Savage
 Fort Snelling (ARNG)
 Mississippi
 Camp Van Dorn
 Missouri
 Camp Crowder
 Fort Osage
 Jefferson Barracks

 Montana
 Fort Missoula
 Nebraska
 Fort Kearny
 Fort Robinson
 Sioux Army Depot
 Nevada
 Camp Williston
 New Jersey
 Camp Charles Wood
 Camp Coles
 Camp Edison
 Camp Kilmer
 Fort Hancock
 Fort Monmouth
 New Mexico
 Camp Cody
 Fort Union
 New York
 Camp Shanks
 Camp Upton
 Fort Niagara
 Fort Totten
 Madison Barracks
 Plattsburgh Barracks
 Seneca Army Depot
 Fort Tilden
 Fort Schuyler
 Floyd Bennett Field
 Fort Jay
 Bush Army Terminal
 Brooklyn Navy Yard
 Fort Wadsworth
 Fort Slocum
 North Carolina
 Camp Bryan Grimes
 Camp Dan Russell
 Camp Davis
 Camp Greene
 Camp Shipp-Bagley
 Fort Caswell
 Fort Fisher
 Fort Johnston
 Fort Macon
 Fort Totten
 Laurinburg-Maxton Army Air Base
 North Dakota
 Fort Abraham Lincoln
 Camp Sutton
 Ohio
 Camp Millard
 Erie Proving Ground
 Fort Hayes
 Oklahoma
 Fort Arbuckle (1832-1834, Tulsa County)
 Fort Arbuckle (1852-1870, Garvin County)
 Camp Nichols
 Fort Arbuckle
 Fort Cobb
 Fort Davis
 Fort Gibson
 Fort McCulloch
 Fort Reno
 Fort Supply
 Fort Towson
 Fort Washita
 Fort Wayne
 Oregon
 Camp Abbott
 Camp Adair
 Camp Sherman
 Fort Stevens (Oregon)
 Camp White
 Pennsylvania
 Shenango Personnel Replacement Depot
 Puerto Rico
 Fort Brooke
 Henry Barracks
 South Carolina
 Camp Croft
 Tennessee
 Camp Forrest
 Camp Tyson
 Texas
 Camp Barkeley
 Camp Howze
 Camp Hulen
 Fort Brown
 Fort Clark
 Fort D.A. Russell
 Fort McIntosh
 Fort Ringgold
 Ingleside Army Depot
 Lone Star Army Ammunition Plant
 Longhorn Army Ammunition Plant
Vermont
 Lyndonville Air Force Listening Station
 Virginia
 Camp Patrick Henry
 Chopawamsic Training Center
 Fort Monroe
 Front Royal Quartermaster Depot
 Vint Hill Farms Station
 Washington
 Camp Bonneville
 Fort Canby
 Fort Casey
 Fort Columbia
 Fort Lawton
 Mount Rainier Ordnance Depot
 Fort Steilacoom
 Vancouver Barracks
 Fort Worden
 Walla Walla Army Air Base
 Wyoming
 Fort Francis E. Warren
 Fort Laramie National Historic Site
 Wyoming National Guard Camp

See also

 List of United States military bases
 List of United States Army airfields
 List of United States Navy installations
 List of United States Marine Corps installations
 List of United States Air Force installations
 List of United States Space Force installations
 Lists of military bases

References

External links

 U.S. Dept. of Defense Base Structure Report FY2003
 U.S. Dept. of Defense Base Structure Report FY2004
 U.S. Dept. of Defense Base Structure Report FY2005
 U.S. Dept. of Defense Base Structure Report FY2007

 
Army
Installations